William Norman Ligon (born May 29, 1952 in Nashville, Tennessee) is a retired professional basketball shooting guard who played one season in the National Basketball Association (NBA) as a member of the Detroit Pistons during the 1974–75 season. The Pistons drafted him from Vanderbilt University during the tenth round (175th pick overall) of the 1974 NBA Draft. He currently works as an attorney, specializing in criminal defense and litigation.

References

External links
 

1952 births
Living people
American men's basketball players
Basketball players from Nashville, Tennessee
Detroit Pistons draft picks
Detroit Pistons players
Shooting guards
Tennessee lawyers
Vanderbilt Commodores men's basketball coaches 
Vanderbilt Commodores men's basketball players
Vanderbilt University Law School alumni